Liu Tzu-hsin (born 5 December 1972) is a Taiwanese softball player. She competed in the women's tournament at the 1996 Summer Olympics.

References

1972 births
Living people
Taiwanese softball players
Olympic softball players of Taiwan
Softball players at the 1996 Summer Olympics
Place of birth missing (living people)